The 1902 Georgetown Blue and Gray football team represented Georgetown University during the 1902 college football season.

Schedule

References

Georgetown
Georgetown Hoyas football seasons
Georgetown Blue and Gray football